Donald Sanderlin (26 February 1933 – 9 January 2013) was a Canadian sports shooter. He competed at the 1968 Summer Olympics and the 1972 Summer Olympics.

References

External links
 

1933 births
2013 deaths
Canadian male sport shooters
Olympic shooters of Canada
Shooters at the 1968 Summer Olympics
Shooters at the 1972 Summer Olympics
People from Beaver County, Alberta
Sportspeople from Alberta
20th-century Canadian people
21st-century Canadian people